Guizhou Provincial Stadium (Simplified Chinese: 贵州省体育场) is an 18,000-capacity multi-use stadium in Guiyang, Guizhou, China.  It is currently used mostly for football matches.

Football venues in China
Sports venues in Guizhou